Homosexuality in the militaries of ancient Greece was regarded as contributing to morale. Although the primary example is the Sacred Band of Thebes, a unit said to have been formed of same-sex couples, the Spartan tradition of military heroism has also been explained in light of strong emotional bonds resulting from homosexual relationships. Various ancient Greek sources record incidents of courage in battle and interpret them as motivated by homoerotic bonds.

Philosophical discourses
Some Greek philosophers wrote on the subject of homosexuality in the military. In Plato's Symposium, the interlocutor Phaedrus commented on the power of male sexual relationships to improve bravery in the military:

However, the Symposium is a dialectical exploration of the nature of true love, in which Phaedrus' views are soon found to be inadequate compared to the transcendent vision of Socrates, who:

 

Xenophon, while not criticizing the relationships themselves, ridiculed militaries that made them the sole basis of unit formation:

Social aspects
According to tradition, the Greeks structured military units along tribal lines, a practice attributed to Nestor in the Homeric epics. The Theban military commander Pammenes, however, is supposed to have advocated military organization based on pairs of lovers:

One such example took place during the Lelantine War between the Eretrians and the Chalcidians. In a decisive battle the Chalcidians called for the aid of a warrior named Cleomachus. Cleomachus answered their request and brought his lover along with him. He charged against the Eretrians and brought the Chalcidians to victory at the cost of his own life. It was said he was inspired with love during the battle. Afterwards, the Chalcidians erected a tomb for him in their marketplace and reversed their negative view of military homosexuality and began to honor it. Aristotle attributed a popular local song to the event:

The importance of these relationships in military formation was not without controversy. According to Xenophon, the Spartans abhorred the thought of using the relationships as the basis of unit formation for placing too much significance on sexuality rather than talent.  This was due to their founder Lycurgus who attacked lusts on physical beauty regarding it as shameful.  Xenophon asserted that in some city-states the lovers would not even have conversations with one another.  He said this type of behavior was horrible because it was entirely based on physical attractions:

Nonetheless city states that employed the practice in determining military formation enjoyed some success. The Thebans had one such regiment as the core of their entire army. They attributed this group called the Sacred Band of Thebes for making Thebes the most powerful city-state for a generation until its fall to Philip II of Macedon. Philip II of Macedon was so impressed with their bravery during the battle he erected a monument that still stands today on their gravesite. He also gave a harsh criticism of the Spartan views of the band:

One of the prominent Greek military figures enjoying such a relationship was Epaminondas, considered the greatest warrior-statesmen of ancient Thebes by many, including the Roman historian Diodorus Siculus. He had two male lovers: Asopichus and Caphisodorus, the latter died with him at Mantineia in battle. They were buried together, something usually reserved for a husband and wife in Greek society. Another pair of warrior-lovers—Harmodius and Aristogeiton—credited with the downfall of tyranny in Athens and the rise of democracy became the emblem of the city.

See also
 Homosexuality in ancient Greece
 The Sacred Band of Stepsons
 Blood brother

References

 Gay Warriors, by Burg, B. R., et al.; New York: New York University Press, 2002. .
 Homosexuality and Civilization, by Crompton, Louis, et al.; Massachusetts: The Belknap Press of Harvard University Press, 2003. .

Further reading
 Daniel Ogden, "Homosexuality and Warfare in Ancient Greece," in Battle in Antiquity (Classical Press of Wales, 2009), pp. 107–68.

External links

Military history of ancient Greece
LGBT history in Greece
Greece
Militaries
Gay history